Uropeltis arcticeps, commonly known as the Madurai earth snake or the Tinevelly uropeltis, is a species of snake in the family Uropeltidae. The species is endemic to India.

Geographic distribution
U. arcticeps is found in South India (Western Ghats south of Palghat; from sea level (Alleppey) to about 5,000 feet in the Travancore Hills; Tinnevelly Hills).

The type locality of Silybura arcticeps is "Tinevelly, S India", and the type locality of Silybura nilgherriensis var. picta is "North Travancore near Peermede,  on coffee estate at an elevation between 3000 and 4000 feet,  S India".

References

Further reading

Günther A (1875). "Second Report on Collections of Indian Reptiles obtained by the British Museum". Proceedings of the Zoological Society of London 1875: 224-234. (Silybura arcticeps, new species, p. 229, Figure 1).
Beddome RH (1878). "Description of six new Species of Snakes of the Genus Silybura, Family Uropeltidæ, from the Peninsula of India". Proc. Zool. Soc. London 1878: 800-802.
Beddome RH (1886). "An Account of the Earth-Snakes of the Peninsula of India and Ceylon". Annals and Magazine of Natural History, Fifth Series 17: 3-33. (Silybura nilgherriensis Var. picta, new variety, p. 16).
Mason GE (1888). "Description of a new Earth-Snake of the Genus Silybura from the Bombay Presidency, with Remarks on other little-known Uropeltidae". Ann. Mag. Nat. Hist., Sixth Series 1: 184-186.

Uropeltidae
Reptiles of India
Endemic fauna of the Western Ghats
Reptiles described in 1875
Taxa named by Albert Günther